In Riemannian geometry, a Berger sphere, named after Marcel  Berger, is a standard 3-sphere with Riemannian metric from a one-parameter family, which can be obtained from the standard metric by shrinking along fibers of a Hopf fibration.  It is interesting in that it is one of the simplest examples of Gromov collapse.

More precisely, one first considers the Lie algebra spanned by generators x1, x2, x3 with Lie bracket [xi,xj] = −2εijkxk.  This is well known to correspond to the simply connected Lie group S3.  Denote by ω1, ω2, ω3 the left invariant 1-forms on S3 which equal the dual covectors to x1, x2, x3. Then the standard metric on S3 is ω12+ω22+ω32. The Berger metric is βω12+ω22+ω32, for any constant β>0.

There are also higher-dimensional analogues of Berger spheres.

References

Riemannian geometry
Spheres